The State of East Indonesia (old spelling: Negara Indonesia Timoer) was a post–World War II state formed in the eastern half of Dutch East Indies. Established in December 1946, it became part of the United States of Indonesia in 1949 at the end of the Indonesian National Revolution, and was dissolved in 1950 with the end of the USI. It comprised all the islands to the east of Borneo (Celebes and the Moluccas, with their offshore islands) and of Java (Bali and the Lesser Sunda Islands).

History
The Dutch authorities, after various changes to the administration of the eastern islands of the East Indies, established the Great East region in 1938. Four years later, the Japanese invaded, and this area was placed under the control of the Imperial Japanese Navy. Following the Japanese surrender and the Indonesian declaration of independence in August 1945, Indonesian republicans began fighting to secure Indonesian independence from Dutch colonial control. However, Dutch administrators backed by Australian troops arrived in the area previously controlled by the Japanese Navy, and prevented republicans from establishing an administration.

From 16 to 25 July 1946, the Dutch organized a conference in the town of Malino on Celebes (Sulawesi) as part of their attempt to arrange a federal solution for Indonesia. The Malino Conference resulted in plans to form a state in Borneo and another for eastern Indonesia (then called the 'Great East'), areas where the Dutch held both de facto and de jure control.  Later that year, Republic of Indonesia agreed to the principle of a federal Indonesia with the Linggadjati Agreement of 15 November. The Denpasar Conference of 18–24 December was held to work out the details of a state which to be called the State of the Great East. That state was established on 24 December and, on 27 December, renamed the State of East Indonesia (Negara Indonesia Timoer or 'NIT', which opponents joked it stood for negara ikoet toean or 'state which goes along with the master', i.e. the Dutch). Nevertheless, it was recognized by the Republic of Indonesia as a state within the United States of Indonesia on 19 January 1948.

With the realization of the United States of Indonesia on 27 December 1949, East Indonesia became a constituent state of the new federation. In much of Indonesia, the federal USI was seen as an illegitimate regime foisted on the islands by the Dutch, and many of the federal states began to merge with the Republic of Indonesia. However many in East Indonesia, with its non-Javanese population and sizable number of Christians, opposed moves toward a unitary state. At the same time, East Indonesia already had to deal with the Twaalfde Provincie ('Twelfth Province') or TWAPRO secessionist movement in Minahasa in 1948, among others.

The formation of East Indonesia's last cabinet in May 1950 with the intention of dissolving the state into the Republic of Indonesia led to open rebellion in the largely Christian Moluccas and the proclamation of an independent Republic of the South Moluccas (RMS). The USI was dissolved on 17 August 1950 and the rebellion in the Moluccas was crushed in November of the same year.

Government
The Denpasar Conference of 18–24 December 1946 approved the Regulations for the Formation of the State of East Indonesia (Peratoeran Pembentoekan Negara Indonesia Timoer) which supplemented the 1927 Dutch colonial law and established the provisional governmental framework of the new state until a constitution could be approved. Although the draft constitution was passed by the legislative on 1 March 1949, it was never adopted and the 1946 regulations remained in place until the state was dissolved. The state was to have an executive president who would appoint a cabinet and a legislature. A number of powers were explicitly reserved for the future United States of Indonesia, of which East Indonesia would be a constituent member.

President

Balinese nobleman Tjokorda Gde Raka Soekawati was elected president at the Denpasar Conference that established the state, and held that position for the duration of the state's existence (24 December 1946 – 17 August 1950). Soekawati would at times went on overseas visit, during which the chair of the Provisional Representative Body would serve as acting president.

Legislature

The Provisional Representative Body for the State of East Indonesia (Dewan Perwakilan Sementara Negara Indonesia Timoer), initially consisting of the 70 participants of the Denpasar Conference, opened its first session on 22 April 1947 in the presence of Lieutenant Governor General of the Dutch East Indies Hubertus van Mook. On 20 February 1950 the Provisional Representative Body of East Indonesia was disbanded after election, and replaced by the People's Representative Council of East Indonesia. The newly formed People's Representative Council was later disbanded following the dissolution of East Indonesia.

In May 1949, a Provisional Senate was established, tasked initially with deliberating proposed constitution for East Indonesia. The Provisional Senate was later disbanded following the dissolution of East Indonesia, before any promulgation of the proposed constitution.

Prime ministers and cabinets

The state had a parliamentary cabinet led by a prime minister, who was appointed by the president. However, much real power remained with the Dutch East Indies authorities.

Administrative divisions
The State of East Indonesia was initially divided into five residencies of the Great East which were in turn divided into districts (afdeling) and subdistricts (onderafdeling), an administrative structure inherited from the Dutch.  Within the residencies were 13 autonomous regions. These regions, listed in Article 14 of the Regulations for the Formation of the State of East Indonesia (Peratoeran Pembentoekan Negara Indonesia Timoer), were South Celebes, Minahasa, Sangihe and Talaud, North Celebes, Central Celebes, Bali, Lombok, Sumbawa, Flores, Sumba, Timor and surrounding islands, South Moluccas, and North Moluccas.

The residencies were to be eliminated after the construction of functioning administration in the 13 regions. Complicating this structure was the fact that:More than 75% of the State of East Indonesia comprised autonomous regions, in total 115 autonomous regional governments under the rule of rajas (swaprajas). The position of these autonomous governmental heads was regulated by what were called korte verklaring (short-term declarations) and lange kontrakten (long-term contracts); these were actually intended as a recognition by the Dutch Indies Government of the special position of the rajas, whose power to govern the autonomous regions was handed down from one generation to the next.
The Autonomous Region Regulation of 1938 gave the swaprajas wide de jure autonomy but most of the rajas were puppets of Dutch administrators. The State of East Indonesia sought to curtail the power of these raja-ruled regions, but the Regulations for the Formation of the State of East Indonesia obliged the state to recognise their special status.

The remaining area of the state not part of the swaprajas comprised directly governed regions (rechtstreeks bestuurd gebied).  Directly governed areas included Minahasa, the South Moluccas, Gorontalo, the districts of Macassar and Bonthain, and Lombok.

Residencies and autonomous regions

The following were the residencies and their autonomous regions.

Notable people
 Tjokorda Gde Raka Soekawati, president
 Nadjamuddin Daeng Malewa, first prime minister
 Semuel Jusof Warouw, second prime minister
 Ide Anak Agung Gde Agung, third prime minister
 Jan Engelbert Tatengkeng, fourth prime minister
 Patuan Doli Diapari, fifth prime minister
 Martinus Putuhena, sixth prime minister
 Eliza Urbanus Pupella, representative of South Moluccas
 Muhammad Kaharuddin III member of the USI Senate
 Tadjuddin Noor chair of the NIT legislature, later member of the Senate
 Melkias Agustinus Pellaupessy, Speaker of Senate
 Arnold Mononutu, member of provisional parliament
 Julius Tahija, representative to United States of Indonesia in Batavia.
 Gabriel Manek, member of provisional parliament

See also 
History of Indonesia
Indonesian National Revolution
Indonesian regions

Notes

References

Sources 

Putra Agung. "Yayasan Masyarakat Sejarawan Indonesia". Jurnal sejarah: pemikiran, rekonstruksi, persepsi. 13 (2007) ISSN 1858-2117.

External links

History and rulers of Indonesian states, 1946–1950 at WorldStatesmen.org

 
States and territories established in 1946
States and territories disestablished in 1950
1945 establishments in Indonesia
1950 disestablishments in Indonesia
Aftermath of World War II
Former republics